Lajes is a municipality in Rio Grande do Norte, Brazil. Pico do Cabugi is located there. On January 1, 1929, Alzira Soriano was sworn mayor of the city, becoming the first female mayor in Brazil and in all South America.

References 

Populated places established in 1914
Municipalities in Rio Grande do Norte